The NASA Exceptional Administrative Achievement Medal is an award given by NASA to any person in the United States federal service for a significant, specific accomplishment or contribution characterized by unusual initiative or creativity that clearly demonstrates a substantial improvement in administrative support contributing to the mission of NASA, such as:

Exceptional initiative in carrying out office/program support activities that resulted in improved processes and operations. 
Development and improvement of administrative support methods and processes that resulted in substantial benefit to the office or program. 
Notable competence and resourcefulness in accomplishing and improving office/program processes and operations.

See also 
List of NASA awards

External links
 NASA awards
 National Aeronautics and Space Administration Honor Awards (1969-1978)

Awards and decorations of NASA